João Batista Inácio (born 22 March 1982), commonly known as Piá, is a Brazilian footballer who plays as a forward.

Football career

Atalanta
Piá got his start by playing for Atalanta in Serie A, where he made his Serie A debut on 2 December 2001, in the 4–2 defeat to Internazionale. He scored only one goal in 23 appearances during his first years at the club. A loan spell came next as he joined up with then Serie B side Ascoli for a season, where this spell proved to be quite a successful time, scoring 13 goals in 36 games.

Napoli
 
After his loan spell ended, Piá returned to Atalanta making 10 more appearances for the club, before transferring to Napoli on a co-ownership deal in January 2005, for €750,000. He scored during his first official match for Napoli, in the 3–0 victory over Giulianova.

Piá helped the club achieve the Serie C1 championship, gaining promotion back into Serie B. The co-ownership deal with Atalanta was resolved in favour of Napoli in early 2005, for another €600,000. Despite being a regular starter with the club, and signing a new deal in May 2006 that will keep him at the club until 2011, he became a surplus in Napoli's Serie A campaign, and thus he was loaned to Treviso for another Serie B season. After just six months in Serie B with Treviso, he was loaned out to Serie A side Catania.

In June 2008, he returned to Napoli to wear once again the Neapolitan colours, and made his debut in the UEFA Cup match against Vllaznia, where he scored a brace in the 3–0 win. In the return fixture, he scored the second goal in the 5–0 defeat of the Albanian club.

In January 2010 he was loaned to Serie B side Torino.

Portogruaro
On 31 August 2010, he left Napoli permanently to join newly promoted Serie B side Portogruaro.

Lega Pro clubs
In September 2011 he left for Italian third division club Pergocrema. After scoring 10 goals with Pergocrema, he signed with Lecce the following the season.

Name spelling
The nickname Piá is pronounced as it is spelled (in his native Portuguese). The accent would signify that the stress is on the second syllable.  In Italian, the language of his current team, the phonetic equivalent is written Pià, which is used for Italian television graphics.

Personal life
He is the older brother of Brazilian footballer Joelson, who also spent most of his career in Italy.

References

External links
Player profile at AIC football website

Brazilian footballers
Brazilian expatriate footballers
Atalanta B.C. players
Ascoli Calcio 1898 F.C. players
S.S.C. Napoli players
Treviso F.B.C. 1993 players
Catania S.S.D. players
Torino F.C. players
A.S.D. Portogruaro players
U.S. Pergolettese 1932 players
U.S. Lecce players
Taranto F.C. 1927 players
S.S.D. Varese Calcio players
Aurora Pro Patria 1919 players
Serie A players
Serie B players
Serie C players
Serie D players
Expatriate footballers in Italy
Expatriate footballers in Greece
Naturalised citizens of Italy
Association football forwards
Footballers from São Paulo (state)
1982 births
Living people
People from Ibitinga